The Sphinx Observatory is an astronomical observatory located above the Jungfraujoch in Switzerland. It is named after the Sphinx, a rocky summit on which it is located. Accessible to the public, it is also the second highest observation deck in Switzerland. The mountain top has been tunneled to fit an elevator which ascends to the observatory from the Jungfraujoch railway station, the highest such train station in Europe. The building is located on the Valais side of the border, only a few metres from the canton of Bern, although it is accessed via the Jungfrau Railway from the Bernese Oberland.

The open viewing deck accessible to the public is adjacent to the observatory. It offers views of the Jungfrau, Mönch, and Eiger peaks, all within a few kilometers.

Science 

The scientific part of the Sphinx observatory includes two large laboratories, a weather observation station, a workshop, two terraces for scientific experiments, and an astronomical as well as a meteorological cupola. The astronomical cupola is equipped with a 76cm telescope with Cassegrain and Coudé focus.

The observatory plays an important role in a range of long-term experiments; it serves as a solar spectrometer for the Institute of Astrophysics and Geophysics at the University of Liège, Belgium, and plays a key role in a LIDAR experiment conducted by the École Polytechnique Fédérale de Lausanne in Switzerland. In 1949, nuclear emulsion plates exposed to cosmic rays in the observatory provided first precise evidence for the existence of the charged K-meson.

In popular media 
The observatory can be seen in the movies The Grand Budapest Hotel, The Hero: Love Story of a Spy and Krrish 3.
It was visited in season 22 of the American reality competition series The Amazing Race during their visit to Switzerland in Leg 8.
It also appears in the 2016 videogame Steep and as the setting for a conference called The Meadows in the final episode of The Pentaverate.

Gallery

See also 
List of buildings and structures above 3000 m in Switzerland
 List of mountains of Switzerland accessible by public transport

References

External links 

 High Altitude Research Stations Jungfraujoch and Gornergrat (HFSJG)

Astronomical observatories in Switzerland
Buildings and structures in Valais
Observation decks